The 2019 SEC softball tournament was be held at Davis Diamond on the campus of Texas A&M University in College Station, Texas, from May 8 through May 11, 2019. The tournament earns the Southeastern Conference's automatic bid to the 2019 NCAA Division I softball tournament. The Championship game, as well as the semifinals, was broadcast on ESPN2, while all other SEC tournament games were live on the SEC Network.

Tournament

 Play-in Game (May 8): #12  vs. #13  - #12 Mississippi State wins 3–2

Schedule
Sources:

References

SEC softball tournament
Southeastern Conference softball seasons
tournament
Southeastern Conference softball tournament
Southeastern Conference softball tournament